AMZ may refer to:

 Abu Musab al-Zarqawi (1966–2006), referred to as AMZ, a militant Islamist from Jordan who ran a paramilitary training camp in Afghanistan
 Allgemeine musikalische Zeitung, 19th century German music journal
 AMZ-KUTNO Ltd, a Polish automotive company
 AMZ Dzik, an infantry mobility vehicle
 AMZ Tur, a light infantry mobility vehicle
 AMZ Żubr, an infantry mobility vehicle
 Ardmore Airport (New Zealand), IATA: AMZ
 At Mount Zoomer, a 2008 album by Canadian band Wolf Parade
 Australian Milking Zebu, a composite breed of dairy cattle
 ISO 639:amz or Uradhi language, an apparently extinct language from Australia